Sledging biscuits are hard, long-life biscuits made of flour, salt, butter, water and baking soda. Sledging biscuits are popular on expeditions in Antarctica because they are high in energy.

Sledging biscuits can be served with butter, marmite or cheese. Hoosh is a stew made of sledging biscuits, pemmican and water.

See also
 
 Hard tack

References 

Biscuits